The Devil's Brother (or Bogus Bandits as an Astor Pictures reissue title) or Fra Diavolo outside the U.S. is a 1933 American Pre-Code comedy film starring Laurel and Hardy. It is based on Daniel Auber's operetta Fra Diavolo about the Italian bandit Fra Diavolo.

Plot
In the early 18th century, the bandit Fra Diavolo returns to his camp in Northern Italy to tell his gang members about his encounter with Lord Rocburg and Lady Pamela. Disguised as the Marquis de San Marco, he rides with them in their carriage and charms Lady Pamela into telling him where she hides her jewels. He orders his thieves to ride to Rocburg's castle and steal his belongings and Pamela's jewels. Meanwhile, Stanlio and Ollio have also been robbed, whereupon Stanlio suggests to Ollio that they should become robbers themselves. After an unsuccessful attempt to rob a woodchopper, the duo encounters Fra Diavolo, who orders Stanlio to hang Ollio for impersonating him. Diavolo is then informed that his men have stolen Lady Pamela's jewels but have not brought the 500,000 francs hidden by Rocburg.

Diavolo, again disguised as the marquis, takes Stanlio and Ollio with him as his servants to an inn, where he plans to steal Rocburg's 500,000 francs, and where, as Marquis de San Marco, he again romances Lady Pamela. Stanlio and Ollio mistakenly capture Lord Rocburg, who has disguised himself as the marquis in an attempt to win back his wife. Diavolo's attempt to find the francs is, however, foiled after Stanlio drinks a sleeping potion meant for Rocburg. Diavolo's theft of Pamela's medallion is blamed on young Captain Lorenzo, the sweetheart of Zerlina, whose father, Matteo the innkeeper, has decreed that she is to marry a merchant named Francesco the next day. Lorenzo swears he will prove his innocence before Zerlina is forced to marry Francesco.

Meanwhile, Diavolo romances Pamela once again and finds out that Rocburg's fortune is hidden in her petticoat. Just as Diavolo steals the petticoat, Lorenzo finds out his true identity from Stanlio, who is "spiffed" after a visit to Matteo's wine cellar. Lorenzo's soldiers surround the inn and he then duels with Diavolo, whom he bests with a little inadvertent help from Stanlio. The good-natured Diavolo returns the jewels, and when Rocburg will not pay the reward for them to Lorenzo, Diavolo gives Lorenzo the money that he stole from Pamela's petticoat. While the jealous husband rushes upstairs to confront his wife, Lorenzo gives the money to Matteo, thereby saving him from having to sell the inn. Diavolo, Stanlio, and Ollio are then taken away to be shot by a firing squad. When Stanlio takes out his red handkerchief in order to blow his nose, a bull becomes enraged and charges the group, allowing Diavolo to escape on his horse and Stanlio and Ollio to escape on the bull.

Cast

Stan Laurel as Stanlio
Oliver Hardy as Ollio
Dennis King as Fra Diavolo/Marquis de San Marco 
Thelma Todd as Lady Pamela 
James Finlayson as Lord Rocburg
Lucile Browne as Zerlina
Arthur Pierson as Lorenzo 
Henry Armetta as Matteo The Innkeeper
Matt McHugh as Francesco
Lane Chandler as Lieutenant
Nina Quartero as Rita 
Wilfred Lucas as Alessandro 
James C. Morton as The Old Woodchopper
John Qualen as Man Who Owned Bull (uncredited)
Arthur Stone as Brigand (uncredited) 
Leo White as Tavern Patron (uncredited)

Kneesy-Earsy-Nosey 
Kneesy-Earsy-Nosey was the game of coordination and dexterity played by Stanlio in the picture, to Ollio's great frustration. The game, which became a fad shortly after the film's release, consists of clapping the knees, then grabbing one ear with the opposite hand while grabbing the nose with the other hand, again clapping the knees, and then grabbing the other ear with the opposite hand while grabbing the nose with the other hand. Participants attempt to do it with increasing speed. Once coordination has been achieved, one can become extremely fast, and proficiency can be regained even after years of hiatus.

Both "Kneesy-Earsy-Nosey" and "Finger Wiggle"—another game Stan plays in Fra Diavolo—make a brief appearance in Babes in Toyland when Oliver Hardy's character (Ollie Dee) tells Stanley's character (Stannie Dum), in relation to hitting a PeeWee, "If you can do it, I can do it." Stannie then performs both games to disprove Ollie's maxim.

References

External links

 
 

1933 films
1933 comedy films
American black-and-white films
Films based on operas
Films based on works by Eugène Scribe
Films directed by Charley Rogers
Films directed by Hal Roach
Films set in Italy
Films set in the 18th century
Laurel and Hardy (film series)
Metro-Goldwyn-Mayer films
Cultural depictions of Fra Diavolo
1930s English-language films
1930s American films